Doxaras railway station is a railway station in Doxaras, Larissa, Thessaly, Greece. It is located 550m west of the village. It is served by only two trains a day (as of 2020).

History 
On 10 April 1924 in Doxaras, twelve masked men disguised as Manlicher rifles boarded the northbound train from Athens to Thessaloniki at around 01:00 and proceeded to rob the passengers, among them the Minister of Social Welfare of Pazis and the former governor of Macedonia, Ioannis Valalas. The thieves escaped with a haul estimated at around 400,000 Δρ. It was the first large-scale train robbery in Greek history.

On 16 January 1972, at around 16:45 on the line between Doxaras and Orfana, a breakdown in communication between the corresponding stationmasters at Doxaras and Orfana coursed an express train and a military relief train to collided in bad weather on the single track line. The southbound diesel hauled Acropolis Express and northbound Number 121 Athens-Thessaloniki, (known as posta) were allowed to proceed without first allowing a passing loop. 21 people died and more than 40 were injured in one of the deadliest rail accident in Greece. Nikolaos Gekas The stationmaster at Orfana was later sentence of 5 years for his part in the disaster.

Services
The station is served by local trains to Thessaloniki, Larissa and Paleofarsalos, with only two services calling at the station.

Station Layout

References

Railway stations in Thessaly
Railway stations opened in 1995